HELP International School (commonly known as HIS) is an international school founded in 2014 in Shah Alam, Selangor, Malaysia.

Help International School first opened its doors to students in 2014. The schools founding principal was Gerard Louis. Gerard Louis left the school at the end of 2014 and was replaced by Davina McCarthy. The school has since grown to around 1,000 students (as of 2016). In 2019 the most recent principal is Martin Van Rijswijk. The school has 5 floors some of the facilities can include the indoor swimming pool, the table tennis room, the grass area, the football range and the large amounts of PE rooms. Furthermore the school has recently finished construction of a new section of the school.(as of 2022) the school costs about 10,000 RM per year. In addition, HIS is also an approved provider of the Duke of Edinburgh's international award.

See also 
 List of schools in Selangor

References

International schools in Selangor
Educational institutions established in 2014
2014 establishments in Malaysia
Cambridge schools in Malaysia
Shah Alam